Whirlwind Recordings is a London, UK-based independent record label established in 2010 by Michael Janisch.

History
The label was founded in 2010 by bassist, composer, educator and producer Michael Janisch in order to release his debut solo album Purpose Built.

Whirlwind Festival
In October 2013, Whirlwind Recordings held the Whirlwind Festival. The festival ran from October 10–12 at Kings Place in London. Among its 18 bands and 86 musicians were Andre Canniere, Greg Osby, Mike Gibbs, Norma Winstone, Robert Mitchell, and Logan Richardson.

References

External links
 

British record labels
Jazz record labels
British jazz record labels
Record labels established in 2010
British companies established in 2010
2010 establishments in England